"I Should've Never Let You Go" is a song by Australian female group Bardot, and was the second single from their debut album Bardot (2000). It was co-written by Lotti Golden, Hinda Hicks and Tommy Faragher and produced by Faragher.

The single debuted at number 15 on the ARIA Singles Chart, peaking one place higher at number 14 and was certified gold. It was the 96th-highest-selling single of Australia in 2000. In New Zealand, it peaked at number 25. The B-side "Do It for Love" is a cover version of a 1992 single by Dannielle Gaha, written by Paul Gray (ex-Wa Wa Nee) and R. Feldman.

Music video

The music video is semi-animated. It features the group in a recording studio flying through space before transforming into animated superheroes whose mission must defeat a giant green monster. In the end, they succeed, and once their mission is complete, return to their real-life selves. Bardot's then-manager, Michael Napthali, makes a small cameo, rounding up the girls back into the recording studio before the end of the song.

Track listing
Australian enhanced CD single (8573835792)
 "I Should've Never Let You Go" (album version)
 "Do It for Love" 
 "I Should've Never Let You Go" (Allstars Remix)
 "I Should've Never Let You Go" (Alex K extended dance mix)
 "I Should've Never Let You Go" (mrTimothy.com Remix) 
 "I Should've Never Let You Go" (TNT Remix) 
 Enhanced CD Rom component (featuring lyrics, photo gallery, screen saver, "Poison" music video)

Personnel
Credits are adapted from the Australia CD single liner notes.
 Bardot – vocals
 Michael Szumowski – keyboards, programming
 Tommy Faragher – writing, production, mixing
 Lotti Golden, Hinda Hicks – writing
 David Hemming – mixing, engineering
 Danielle McWilliam – engineering assistant
 Vlado Meller – mastering
 Kathy Naunton – additional mastering
 Michael Napthali – management
 Stephen Oxenbury – photography
 Kevin Wilkins – art direction

Charts

Weekly charts

Year-end charts

Certifications

References

2000 singles
2000 songs
Bardot (Australian band) songs
Songs written by Lotti Golden
Songs written by Tommy Faragher
Warner Music Group singles